Baybars or Baibars is a given name of Kipchak Turkic origin. It may refer to:

Baybars I (1223–1277), fourth sultan of Mamluk Egypt
Baybars II (d. 1310), twelfth sultan of Mamluk Egypt
Baybars al-Mansuri (d. 1325), Mamluk official and historiographer
Baibars (Trinity Blood character)

See also
Rukn al-Din (disambiguation)